The 19th European Badminton Championships were held in Geneva, Switzerland, between 16 and 24 April 2004.

Medalists

Results

Men's singles

Women's singles

Men's doubles

Women's doubles

Mixed doubles

Medal table

References

External links
 Results at BE

European Badminton Championships
European Championships
B
B
Badminton tournaments in Switzerland
Sports competitions in Geneva
21st century in Geneva